Sean McNabb (born September 24, 1965) is an American actor and bassist. While still on tour with rock bands, he is also acting and writing, composing, and singing music for TV and film. In 2015, he released his first solo music as a lead singer, "Fresh Air" and "America". Both are also featured in the film Rockstory.

McNabb was born in South Bend, Indiana. At age 21, he became the bass player of the 1980s metal band Quiet Riot, replacing Chuck Wright.

McNabb joined Dokken as their bassist in 2009 and was a mainstay with the band until 2014. He has recorded over 35 CDs in his discography. He has also toured and recorded with House of Lords (where he again replaced Wright), Great White, Lynch Mob, Montrose, Queensrÿche, Jack Wagner, Don Felder, Edgar Winter, Maya, Bad Moon Rising, Rough Cutt, Burning Rain, and XYZ. McNabb can be heard on the Dr. Phil show in the music tracks and the "I'm Loving It" McDonald's breakfast commercials. McNabb has also performed with several pop artists, country, blues, and folk singer/songwriters.

In addition to music, he is acting in Hollywood in film and television and has twenty credits on IMDb. Of note, he appeared on FX TV's Sons of Anarchy and as host of Best of AXS TV Concerts 2012 – Legends of Rock. He starred along TV and Broadway greats in Los Angeles plays. He has appeared in films, TV and in commercials. He was on the cover, and was profiled, by the Beverly Hills Times as a rising star in the world of acting.

McNabb is also active in the Los Angeles charity scene (including celebrity golf tournaments and Harley rides), appearing in such magazines as Angeleno and LA Confidential. He married Los Angeles based KTTV news anchor Christine Devine on September 9, 2016. He has a daughter, Lauriel, and a grandson, Malcolm.

Discography

With Quiet Riot 
Quiet Riot (1988)

With House of Lords 
Demons Down (1992)

With Badd Boyz 
Bad Boyz (1993)

With Great White 
Great Zeppelin: A Tribute to Led Zeppelin (1998)
Can't Get There from Here (1999)
Latest and Greatest (2000)
Thank You...Goodnight! (2002)
Back to the Rhythm (2007)

With XYZ 
Letter to God (2003)

With Dokken 
Greatest Hits (2010)
Broken Bones (2012)

With Burning Rain 
Epic Obsession (2013)

With Black Bart 
Bootleg Breakout

With Rough Cutt 
Sneak Peek EP (2000)

With Resurrection Kings 
Resurrection Kings (2015)

With Lynch Mob 
The Brotherhood (2017)

References 

American rock bass guitarists
American heavy metal bass guitarists
American male bass guitarists
Quiet Riot members
Rough Cutt members
Great White members
Dokken members
1965 births
Living people
House of Lords (band) members
Actors from South Bend, Indiana
Musicians from South Bend, Indiana
American male television actors
Male actors from Los Angeles
Guitarists from Indiana
20th-century American guitarists
Burning Rain members